Carmenta subaerea is a moth of the family Sesiidae. It was described by Henry Edwards in 1883 and is known from the US state of Arizona.

References

Sesiidae
Moths described in 1883